Hazel Natasha Nali (born 4 April 1998) is a Zambian footballer who plays as a goalkeeper for Fatih Vatan Spor in the Turkish Women's Super League and the Zambia women's national team. She played for the senior national team at the 2014 African Women's Championship at the 2018 Africa Women Cup of Nations, at the 2020 COSAFA Women's Championship, and at the 2020 Summer Olympics.

Club career 
At club level, Nali has played in Zambia for Chibolya Queens in Lusaka, for Nchanga Queens in Chingola, for Indeni Roses in Ndola, and for Green Buffaloes in Lusaka. In March 2020, she won the FAZ Women Super division with Green Buffaloes.

In November 2020, Nali joined Israeli club Hapoel Be'er Sheva who compete in the Ligat Nashim on a one-year deal. She started every one of the first games of the season and, in their sixth game, kept her first clean sheet to help the club claim their first victory of the season, beating Hapoel Ra'anana 2–0.

In March 2022, she moved to Turkey and joined the Istanbul-based club Fatih Vatan Spor to play in the second half of the 2021-22 Women's Super League season.

International career 
Nali played for Zambia's under-17 squad in the 2014 FIFA U-17 Women's World Cup. She played all three games for Zambia, losing 2–0 to Italy and 4–0 to Venezuela before beating Costa Rica 2–1.

In October 2014, Nali was named for Zambia's senior squad for the 2014 African Women's Championship.

In November 2018, Nali was called up for the 2018 Africa Women Cup of Nations.

In November 2020, Nali was called up for the 2020 COSAFA Women's Championship.

In July 2021, Nali was called up for Zambia's squad for the 2020 Summer Olympics.

References

External links 
 CAF player profile

1998 births
Living people
Place of birth missing (living people)
Zambian women's footballers
Zambia women's international footballers
Women's association football goalkeepers
Footballers at the 2020 Summer Olympics
Olympic footballers of Zambia
Zambian expatriate footballers
Zambian expatriate sportspeople in Turkey
Expatriate women's footballers in Turkey
Turkish Women's Football Super League players
Fatih Vatan Spor players